Urfa, officially recognized as Şanlıurfa, is a city in southeastern Turkey and the capital of Şanlıurfa Province. Known in ancient times as Edessa, Urfa is situated on a plain about 80 km east of the Euphrates River. Its climate features extremely hot, dry summers and cool, moist winters.

The area was part of a network of the first human settlements where the agricultural revolution took place. Because of its association with Jewish, Christian, and Islamic history, and a legend according to which it was the hometown of Abraham, Urfa is nicknamed the "City of Prophets."

Religion is important in Urfa. The city "has become a center of fundamentalist Islamic beliefs" and "is considered one of the most devoutly religious cities in Turkey".

The city is located 30 miles from the Atatürk Dam, at the heart of the Southeast Anatolia Project, which draws thousands of job-seeking rural villagers to the city every year. As a result, many of Urfa's residents are very poor – according to municipal data, over 50% of the city's population lives below the poverty line, earning less than $100 per family per month.

Name
The oldest name for the city is the Syriac Orhay, which is derived from either the Semitic root -r-w-ʿ, meaning "to bring water", or the Greek name name "Orrha", meaning "beautiful flowing water".

James Silk Buckingham claimed that in earlier times, the city was known as Ruha, and with the Arabic article, it became Ar-Ruha, evolving into Urha, and eventually Urfa. Carsten Niebuhr observed that Turks called the city El-Rohha in the 18th century, although Buckingham who later visited Urfa, disagreed and noted that all Turks, and most Arabs and Kurds in the surrounding countryside called it Urfa, while a small portion of the Christians called it as the former. The city is called  in Kurdish.

In 1984, the Turkish National Assembly granted Urfa the title "Şanlı", meaning "glorious", in honor of its citizens' resistance against British and French troops at the end of the First World War, hence the present name "Şanlıurfa".

Geography

Urfa is located at the border between the foothills of the Taurus Mountains and the great Mesopotamian plain. In general, these two regions meet "well to the south" of Urfa, but around Harran the plain extends northward, cutting into the hills. At the northwestern corner of the Harran plain, there is another extension in the plain, this time going westward. Urfa is located in this second extension of the plains, tucked behind the hills at its southern edge.

A small stream flows through Urfa. This stream is known as the Daisan, or "leaping river", after its tendency for flooding. Today, the Daisan flows through a man-made channel that follows the north and east sides of the old walled city. Before the channel was made, though, the stream's natural course was on the west side of the old city, then it turned east. Part of the former course survives as the fish pool called Birket Ibrahim, which tradition associates with the prophet Abraham. To the south of the stream's old course is a spring in a cave that is now converted into a mosque.

Since the 20th century, Urfa has expanded northward, across the little plain and the hill known as Şehitlik Mahallesi with blocks of flats, as well as over the escarpment to the south.

History
Urfa was founded as a city under the name Edessa by the Seleucid king Seleucus I Nicator in 303 or 302 BC. There is no written evidence for earlier settlement at the site, but Urfa's favorable commercial and geographical placement suggests that there was a smaller settlement present prior to 303 BC. The indigenous Aramaic name for the site prior to the Seleucid period was Orhai or Orhay, which survives as the basis of the city's modern Turkish name. Perhaps Orhai's absence from earlier written sources is due to the settlement having been small and unfortified prior to the Seleucid period. Seleucus named the city after the ancient capital of Macedonia.

In the late 2nd century, as the Seleucid dynasty disintegrated, it became the capital of the Arab Nabataean Abgar dynasty, which was successively Parthian, Aramean/Syriac kingdom Osroene, Armenian, and Roman client state and eventually a Roman province. Its location on the eastern frontier of the Empire meant it was frequently conquered during periods when the Byzantine central government was weak, and for centuries, it was alternately conquered by Arab, Byzantine, Armenian, and Turkish rulers. In 1098, the Crusader Baldwin of Boulogne induced the final Armenian ruler to adopt him and then seized power, establishing the first Crusader State known as the County of Edessa and imposing Latin Christianity on the Greek Orthodox, Assyrian Church of the East and Armenian Apostolic majority of the population.

Urfa was conquered by Imad al-Din Zengi in 1144 after a month-long siege, and from that point the city came under the Zengid dynasty. The last count of Edessa besieged the city again in 1146 in an attempt to retake it from the Zengids, but only held the city for six days before being defeated by Zangi's son Nur ad-Din. Urfa's population was massacred in the process, and its Christian community never recovered.

After the Zengids, Urfa was ruled by the Ayyubid dynasty from 1182 to 1260, when it was captured by the Mongols. In the early 1300s, it became part of the Mamluk Sultanate, and then the Aq Qoyunlu captured it in the early 1400s. The Ottoman Empire took Urfa from the Mamluk Sultanate around 1517 and ruled it until the 20th century. Under Ottoman rule, Urfa was initially made centre of Raqqa Eyalet, laterly part Urfa (Sanjak) of the Aleppo Vilayet. The area became a centre of trade in cotton, leather, and jewellery.

Prehistory

Urfa shares the Balikh River Valley region with two other significant Neolithic sites at Nevalı Çori and Göbekli Tepe. Settlements in the area originated around 9000 BC as a PPNA Neolithic sites located near Abraham's Pool (Site Name: Balıklıgöl). They were part of a network of first settlements spanning West Asia where agriculture began. The life-sized limestone "Urfa Man" statue was found at Urfa during an excavation and is now on display at the Şanlıurfa Archaeology and Mosaic Museum. The Urfa Man resembles both carvings at nearby Gobekli Tepe and statues found at 'Ain Ghazal. The village at Balıklıgöl was followed by a string of four PPNB villages on four hilltops at the Gürcütepe site. Beginning in 6200 BC small Halaf culture villages began to appear in the Balikh Valley. The typical Halaf village is 2ha with a population of 500 people surrounded by agricultural fields. By 5000 BC the entire valley was densely filled.

In prehistoric times, the Urfa Region was attractive for human habitation because of its dense grazing areas and the presence of wild animals on migration routes. As a result, the area became densely populated, particularly in the Neolithic period.

In Urfa itself, there was a prehistoric settlement at Yeni Mahalle Höyüğü (aka Balıklıgöl Höyüğü), located immediately north of Balıklıgöl in the heart of the old town. Now buried under single-story houses, the site was accidentally discovered during road construction in the 1990s and then excavated in 1997 by the Şanlıurfa Museum Directorate. The findings included flint tools, arrowheads dated to the early Pre-Pottery Neolithic B phase, and two round buildings with terrazzo floors. Animal bones found at the site indicate hunting activity, and charred seed samples indicate that the villagers cultivated wheat and barley. The village at Yeni Mahalle is radiocarbon dated to roughly 9400–8600 BCE.

A much later artifact is a black stone pedestal with a double bull relief, found at a hill called Külaflı Tepe in the former village of Cavşak in the 1950s when the village was being evacuated to build a base for the Urfa Brigade. The pedestal contains an inscription with an invocation to the god Tarhunza and mentions a city whose name is only partly visible, but which Bahattin Çelik restores as "Umalia", in the country of Bit Adini.

City of Edessa

Ancient sources describe Seleucid Edessa as following the typical plan for Hellenistic military colonies: its streets were laid out in a grid pattern, with four main streets that intersected each other. There were four city gates, and the main citadel was outside the walls. Macedonian soldiers were settled in the new city, but they never formed a majority of its population. The city's culture remained predominantly Semitic (specifically Aramaic), and any Hellenization was minimal.

Edessa was an important commercial center in the 3rd and 2nd centuries BC. Previously, the main east-west trade route across Upper Mesopotamia had gone through Harran, but the founding of Edessa caused that route to shift northwards.

The Seleucids declined in the 2nd century BC, and Edessa became the capital of the Abgarid kingdom of Osrhoene in about 132 BC. Originally from Nisibis, the Abgarids appear to have been an Arabized dynasty and may have ruled their kingdom "much as Arab shaikhs, through a council of tribal elders". The Abgarids were generally allied with the Parthian Empire and were under Parthian cultural influence as well. 

In the early second century AD, however, the Abgarids came under Roman influence. Abgar VII supported the Roman emperor Trajan's campaign in Mesopotamia and received him "sumptously" at his court, but later rebelled. In retaliation, the Romans captured and destroyed Edessa, and Abgar VII was killed. The Romans installed a Parthian prince, Parthamaspates, on the Edessan throne as a puppet ruler in 117, but the Abgarids were later restored to power. Similarly, the Parthians captured Edessa in 163 and installed Wa'el bar Sharu as a puppet king. The deposed Ma'nu VIII went to the Romans, who took Edessa in 165 and restored Ma'nu to power. In 166, Osrhoene became a Roman client kingdom.

Ma'nu VIII died in 177 and was succeeded by Abgar VIII, also called Abgar the Great. Abgar sided with Pescennius Niger in his civil war against Septimius Severus. Severus ended up winning that conflict and, as punishment, stripped Abgar of most of his kingdom. Osrhoene now became a Roman province, while Abgar himself was left to rule just Edessa. Abgar mostly retired from international politics and spent the rest of his reign as "one of the Near East's greatest patrons of the arts and learning".

In 201, much of Edessa was destroyed by a major flood. According to the Chronicle of Edessa, over 2,000 people died. Abgar granted a remission of taxes for all who were affected by the flood and immediately began a large-scale reconstruction project of the city after the old Seleucid plan. Abgar repaired the old royal palace by the river, which had been damaged by the flood, but he also built a new palace on higher ground.

In 1979, an archaeological excavation at present-day Çamlık Parkı in central Urfa uncovered seven rock-cut tombs dating back to the first centuries AD. Mosaics on the floor appear to contain portraits of several members of the Abgarid dynasty, possibly including Abgar the Great. The tombs have since been closed back up with the mosaics still inside.

Ancient Edessa's diverse religious background

Ancient Edessa was an eclectic melting pot of different religious groups. Unlike Harran, where the cult of the moon god Sin predominated, the people of Edessa worshipped a whole pantheon of gods that can generally be identified with planets. The most important were Nabu and Bel. The cult of the sun and moon that was later known in Harran as the Sabians also had followers in Edessa. The fertility goddess Atargatis, whose cult was based at Manbij, was also worshipped in Edessa. Fish were an important symbol of Atargatis, and in ancient Edessa there was a fish pond filled with sacred carp dedicated to Atargatis – today's Balıklıgöl. Other gods worshipped in pagan Edessa included the Nabataean deity Dushara, the Mesopotamian goddess Ishtar, and also the moon god Sin. Another important cult at Edessa involved the veneration of a virgin mother and her child.

In addition to polytheists, Edessa also had a prominent Jewish community. Many of Edessa's Jews were merchants, involved in long-distance trade between the Persian Gulf and the Mediterranean.

By the end of the 2nd century, a small Christian community had appeared in Edessa. The city's cosmpolitan religious background meant that its people were open and accepting towards this new religion, which just added another element into the mix. Christianity also resonated with several religious themes already present in Edessa – besides the concept of a virgin mother and child, there was also the concept of a divine trinity and a hope for life after death. The people of Edessa were also familiar with monotheism, through exposure to Judaism, and Edessa's Jewish community was probably partly responsible for the rapid spread of Christianity in the city. Abgar the Great reportedly converted to Christianity around the turn of the 3rd century, which if true would make Edessa the first Christian polity in the world.

Still more religions joined the mix during the 3rd century. One was the Bardaisanites, founded by the important philosopher Bardaisan who Abgar the Great was a patron of. Another was the Elkesaites, a syncretic religion that combined elements of Christianity, Judaism, and paganism. Its founder, Elkesai, claimed to be a reincarnation of Jesus, and the Elkesaite belief in reincarnation is possibly a sign of Buddhist influence. The prophet Mani was an Elkesaite before founding Manichaeism – another syncretic religion that "found ready ground in Edessa". There was already an active Manichaean community in Edessa during Mani's lifetime: there is a reference in the Cologne Mani Codex to a letter he wrote to his followers in Edessa. Manichaeism's spread to Edessa was attributed to two of Mani's disciples named Addai and Thomas. Edessa's Manichaean community remained prominent until the 5th century.

Edessa under Roman rule
Abgar the Great died in 212 and was succeeded by Abgar IX, also called Severus as a sign of Roman influence. Abgar IX only reigned for a year – in 213, he was summoned to Rome by the emperor Caracalla, who then had him murdered. In 214, Caracalla made Edessa a Roman colony, officially ending any autonomy the city had. A son of Abgar IX, known as Ma'nu IX, appears to have been nominally a king until 240; he received an embassy from India in 218, during the reign of Elagabalus, but he did nothing else of note. The monarchy seems to have been restored to power at some point – an Abgar IX was apparently king until 248, when the emperor Philip the Arab had him banished after Edessa rebelled.

In 260, the Sasanian emperor Shapur I defeated the Romans in the Battle of Edessa and captured the emperor. However, either Shapur never actually captured the city or he only held it for a very short time – it is not listed among the cities he captured in his inscription on the Ka'ba-ye Zartosht, and in the aftermath of the battle he had to bribe Edessa's garrison to let his army pass unmolested.

As a result of Diocletian's reorganization of the empire in 293, a state-run factory was built at Edessa to make weapons and equipment for the soldiers stationed along the border. In 298, after Galerius Maximianus's victory over the Sasanians, Edessa was made capital of the new province of Osrhoene. It served as a military base in the Mesopotamian limes, although it was secondary to Nisibis in that system.

Edessa during late antiquity
In the 4th through 6th centuries AD, Edessa went through arguably its period of greatest prosperity. It was again an important commercial center, and merchants grew rich on trade in luxury goods from the east, particularly silk. As with later periods, the city had a council of notable citizens who were at least partly in charge of local government and administration. In the 5th century there were three different theological schools in Edessa: the School of the Syrians (affiliated with the patriarchate of Antioch), the School of the Armenians, and the famous School of the Persians (whose teachers were not actually Persians but rather members of the Church of the East). The School of the Persians was closed down in 489 and its staff relocated to Nisibis. There were many churches in the city and monasteries in the area. Just outside the walls were several infirmaries and hospitals.

When the Roman emperor Jovian surrendered Nisibis to the Sasanians in 363, an influx of refugees came to Edessa, including many Christians. One of these refugees was the writer and theologian Ephrem the Syrian, who was a co-founder of the School of the Persians in Edessa. According to T.A. Sinclair, as Christianity gained more of a presence in Edessa, the pagan planet-worshippers increasingly emigrated to Harran.

By the early 6th century, a small lake had formed on the west side of the city. In 525, a flood destroyed part of the western city wall and damaged some of the city. Afterwards, a deep ditch was dug on the north and east sides of the city to act as a flood channel. In normal weather, a low dam kept the Daisan river in its original course, but if the dam overflowed, then the floodwaters would flow through the artificial channel instead of into the city. At some point later on, the flood channel became the normal course of the river.

Edessa successfully held out during a siege in 544. In 609, however, the Sasanian emperor Khosrow II captured Edessa during his campaign in Mesopotamia. Many of the city's Monophysites were deported to Iran. In 628, the Byzantine emperor Heraclius captured Edessa.

Age of Islam
Urfa surrendered to the Rashidun general Iyad ibn Ghanm in 639 without resistance, supposedly when Iyad "stood at its gate riding a brown horse" according to al-Baladhuri. Several versions of the terms of surrender appear in historical sources, mentioning the citizens would be responsible for "repairing 'bridges and roads'". The pact also guaranteed that the city's Christians would keep ownership of the cathedral. Sometime shortly after Urfa submitted to Muslim rule, a mosque was built in the city, although its location is unknown.

In the early centuries of Arab rule, and particularly under the Umayyads, Urfa was still a major Christian city. It formed part of the province of Diyar Mudar. The city reportedly had 300 or 360 churches, and there were many monasteries. The population was mostly Syrian Orthodox but with significant Melkite and Jewish minorities; there were relatively few Muslims. The city was led by a group of distinguished citizens, including magnates and agricultural landowners, who "formed a partly self-governing body" that dealt with the caliphal government rather than the bishop. Some of the leading families in this period included the Gūmāyē, the Telmaḥrāyē, and the Ruṣāfāyē.

During the reign of the Abbasid caliph al-Mansur, the city walls were demolished after the local Muslim governor revolted. The old walls had already been damaged by floods in the 7th and 8th centuries. In 812, Urfa's citizens had to pay a large sum to the anti-Abbasid rebel Nasr ibn Shabath al-Uqayli to prevent him from attacking the unprotected city. Afterwards, the citizens had new defensive walls built around the city. According to Bar Hebraeus, the walls were commissioned by someone named Abu Shaykh and paid for by the citizens. The walls and towers visible today belong to this rebuilding effort, albeit with later renovations. The citadel was likely begun at the same time, probably with the addition of a moat on the south side.

When the caliph al-Ma'mun came to power in 813, he dispatched his general Tahir ibn Husayn to Urfa to put down Nasr ibn Shabath's rebellion. The rebels besieged Tahir's forces in Urfa, but the local civilians (one of them was the future Syriac church leader Dionysius I Telmaharoyo) supported the soldiers and the siege was unsuccessful. Tahir's troops later mutinied, however, and he was forced to flee to Raqqa; he later appointed someone named 'Abd al-A'la as governor of Urfa. In 825, while Tahir's son Abdallah was governor of al-Jazira, his brother Muhammad enacted a series of anti-Christian policies in Urfa. He ordered the destruction of several churches, claiming that they had illegally been built after the Muslim conquest. That same year, he also had a new mosque built in the tetrapylon in front of the city's Melkite cathedral. Before its conversion into a mosque, the tetrapylon had been a meeting place for church leaders. The locations of the mosque and cathedral are unknown.

In the spring of 943, the Byzantine army campaigned in upper Mesopotamia, capturing several cities and either threatening Urfa or, according to Symeon Magister, besieging it outright. The Byzantines that the mandylion (called al-mandīl in Arabic), by now a famous Christian relic, be handed over to the emperor. In return, the city would be spared and 200 Muslim prisoners would be released. With permission from the caliph al-Muttaqi, the people of Edessa handed over the mandylion and signed a truce with the Byzantines. The mandylion was translated to Constantinople; it arrived "triumphantly" on 15 August 944.

11th century
The Numayrid emir Waththab ibn Sabiq declared independence in 990 and annexed Edessa early in his reign. Waththab appointed his cousin 'Utayr as governor of the city. 'Utayr installed someone named Ahmad ibn Muhammad as his na'ib (deputy) here, but then later had him assassinated. This evidently made 'Utayr unpopular with the locals, since Ahmad had treated them well. In 1025/6 (416 AH), the city's inhabitants rebelled and appealed to Nasr ad-Dawla, the Marwanid emir of Diyar Bakr. At first, Nasr ad-Dawla appointed someone named Zangi to be his deputy in Edessa, but Zangi died in 1027. Meanwhile, 'Utayr had been assassinated. This time, Nasr ad-Dawla ended up appointing two deputies to jointly control Edessa: he chose 'Utayr's son, known only by the nasab "Ibn 'Utayr", to be in charge of the main citadel, while he appointed a different Numayrid named Shibl ad-Dawla to be in charge of the smaller citadel – i.e. the converted east gate, now the Bey Kapısı.

In October 1031, the Byzantine general George Maniakes conquered Edessa. This would ultimately be the last significant territorial acquisition by the Byzantine Empire in Mesopotamia. The accounts of this event differ heavily. According to one version, Ibn 'Utayr had entered into negotiations with Maniakes, intending to sell him the citadel. His desire to sell was apparently motivated by a threat from Shibl ad-Dawla. In John Skylitzes's version, however, Maniakes had bribed Salman, a deputy of Nasr ad-Dawla's, into surrendering the city to him in the middle of the night. If this was the case, then Salman either had some authority over Ibn 'Utayr or had otherwise deposed him.

Whoever Maniakes had been negotiating with, Byzantine forces gained control of some of the fortifications but not the rest of the city. Exactly which parts Maniakes had taken control of are unclear – Skylitzes described Maniakes had taken possession of "three heavily fortified towers", but his description of Edessa's geography is completely inaccurate and he clearly had never been to the city himself. Matthew of Edessa's account, which is more reliable, mentions "three citadels"; according to Tara Andrews, the upper citadel must have been one of them. According to T.A. Sinclair, Maniakes had already gained control of the upper citadel. That winter, Nasr ad-Dawla came with an army in an attempt to drive out the Byzantines. Nasr ad-Dawla tried to besiege the Byzantine positions but was unsuccessful and decided to loot the city and tear down buildings, then burn the city to the ground while retreating with camels carrying off precious objects. According to Skylitzes, Maniakes was able to then capture the citadel and, summoning external reinforcements, secure the whole city.

Maniakes remained in charge of Edessa for several years and, according to Honigmann and Bosworth, appears to have been relatively autonomous from the Byzantines, merely sending an annual tribute to Constantinople. On the other hand, while Skylitzes does mention that "Maniakes sent an annual tribute of 50 pounds [of gold] to the emperor", Niccolò Zorzi remarks that this "does not necessarily imply that Edessa 'enjoyed a certain amount of independence from Byzantium'". The citadel became known as "Maniakes's citadel" at some point.

In May 1036, the Numayri prince Ibn Waththab plundered the city and took the patricius of Edessa as prisoner, but the fortress remained in the hands of the Byzantine garrison. A peace treaty was reached in 1037; under its terms, Edessa came directly under Byzantine control and it was refortified. Edessa now became an important Byzantine command placed under a series of katepanos and dukes. The "duchy" of Edessa probably comprised the whole area beyond the Euphrates under their control with several fortresses north of the river. The city "was still inhabited by many Christians" at this point.

In 1065-6 and 1066-7, the city was attacked by the Turkish leader Khurasan-Salar. For 50 days beginning on 10 March 1071, Urfa was besieged by the Seljuk sultan Alp Arslan. Alp Arslan eventually lifted the siege in return for a large payment and possibly also the submission of its ruler, the doux Basilios Alousianos (son of Alusian of Bulgaria). After the Battle of Manzikert, Edessa was intended to be handed over to the Seljuks, but the Byzantine emperor Romanos Diogenes was deposed and in the political chaos its katepano Paulus ended up siding with the new emperor.

In 1077 or 1078, Basil Apokapes besieged and captured Edessa, displacing the Byzantine governor Leo Diabatenos. He was an agent of Philaretos Brachamios, the main Byzantine agent in the region who governed from Marash; however, Basil ruled Edessa independently. In 1081-2, an amir named Khusraw unsuccessfully besieged the city. After Basil's death in 1083, the citizens of Edessa elected an Armenian named Smbat to succeed him. Smbat was in charge for six months before Philaretos came in person on 23 September 1083. He appointed a Greek eunuch as governor and gave him the title parakoimomenos; this eunuch was later assassinated by an official named Barsauma.

However, Edessa was in a particularly vulnerable position "caught between two blocks of Uqaylid territory", and it was particularly vulnerable to the Seljuks. In 1086-7, the Seljuk sultan Malik Shah I sent his general Buzan to take the city while he himself campaigned in Syria. A three-month siege followed, with Barsauma defending the city. The city surrendered in March 1087 and Buzan appointed a Seljuk commander to head the citadel. At some point, an Armenian named Toros in charge of the city administration – according to the Syriac Chronicle of 1234, this happened in 1087, while Matthew of Edessa wrote that it happened after Buzan's death in 1094. Toros appears to have begun a rebuilding project on the Bey Kapısı fortress, but it wasn't finished until after his rule. Meanwhile, Malik Shah had died in 1092 and a Seljuk dynastic crisis had broken out. In 1094, Malik Shah's brother Tutush demanded the city's surrender, but both Toros and the Seljuk citadel commander refused. Tutush's forces seized the citadel and made their encampment on the west side of the city. Fearing an attack from them, Toros apparently tried to cut the citadel off by building a wall between it and the city. After Tutush died in 1095, however, his forces abandoned the citadel and Toros now took control of the whole city as a de facto independent ruler.

During the 11th century, there was a large influx of Armenian immigrants into the region, especially the towns. In Urfa, they supplanted Syrians as the leading citizens and wealthiest landowners.

County of Edessa

Urfa was capital of the crusader County of Edessa for about half a century beginning in 1098. The crusaders' subjects were a mix of Armenians and Syrians. In Urfa itself, Armenians were the dominant group. The crusaders themselves don't seem to have undertaken much construction in Urfa. The only extant structure that can be attributed to them is the southernmost tower of the Bey Kapısı, on the east side of the city walls. This was completing the rebuilding that Toros had begun before the crusaders seized Edessa and was finished in 1122-3, while the count Joscelin was in captivity at Harput.

Sieges of 1144 and 1146

The County of Edessa had survived largely because their Muslim rivals were disunited. The rise of a single powerful Muslim rival – namely Imad ad-Din Zangi, the crafty atabeg of Mosul – spelled disaster for the county. The tipping point came in late 1144, when Joscelin II left Edessa with a big chunk of his soldiers to assist Zengi's rival Kara Arslan. 

Upon becoming aware of the city's weakness, Zengi led a series of forced marches and laid siege to the city on 24 November. By 24 December, he had successfully gained entry to the city; the citadel fell two days later on the 26th. Zengi's forces spared the native Christian population and their churches, but the Franks were killed and their churches destroyed. Zengi then appointed Zayn ad-Din Ali Küçük, the commander of his guard, as governor of the city.

The fall of Edessa was a direct motivator for the Second Crusade. Christian pilgrims returning to Europe brought news of the city's conquest, and emissaries from the crusader states also came to appeal for help. The pope responded by issuing the papal bull Quantum praedecessores on 1 December 1145, which directly called for another crusade. Meanwhile, in the Muslim world, news of this victory made Zengi a hero. The caliph gave him many gifts and titles, including al-malik al-mansūr – "the victorious king".

In May 1146, there was a plot by Urfa's Armenian community to overthrow the Turks and restore the city to Joscelin. The Turks suppressed this plot and settled 300 Jewish families in the city. However, after Zengi was assassinated on 14 September 1146, the Armenians again conspired with Joscelin to take the city. Sometime in October, Joscelin and Baldwin of Marash came and laid siege to the city. This second siege proved far more destructive than the first. The Franks succeeded in entering the city, but they were not properly equipped for a siege of the main citadel. During their six-day-long reoccupation of Urfa, the Franks indiscriminately looted shops belonging to Christians and Muslims alike. The city's Muslims either fled to Harran or took shelter in the citadel with the Turkish garrison.

Meanwhile, Imad ad-Din's successor Nur ad-Din Zengi had arrived with an army of 10,000 soldiers and surrounded the city. When the Franks realized they were trapped, they attempted to retreat, but it ended in disaster and they were slaughtered as they tried to escape. Moreover, the city's population was massacred – the men were put to death, while the women and children were sold into slavery. The city's Christian community, one of the oldest in the world, had been destroyed and never recovered.

Zengid rule
Although Nur ad-Din was an active builder elsewhere, only one building at Urfa can be attributed to him: the "rather plain" Great Mosque, which was probably on the site of an earlier church.

After Nur ad-Din's death in 1174, Urfa was captured by his nephew Sayf al-Din Ghazi II.

Ayyubid dynasty

Saladin captured Urfa in 1182 after a siege; he then separately besieged the citadel. He ended up paying the defenders off to let him take control of the citadel. He then appointed Muzaffar al-Din Gökböri as governor of Urfa along with Harran. During Saladin's reign, the cathedral of the Melkites was demolished. Part was used as building material for Urfa's citadel, and part was taken to Harran.

The Ayyubid empire essentially functioned as a dynastic "confederation of principalities united under one leading prince". During Saladin's reign, he established a principality based at Harran; Urfa was part of this principality. After Gökböri, the Harran-Urfa principality was also held by Saladin's brother al-Adil, who later ruled as the Ayyubid sultan himself.

During Ayyubid rule, Edessa had a population of approximately 24,000, according to J.C. Russell's estimate (Russell generally favored smaller, more conservative estimates).

In June 1234, the city was taken by the Seljuk sultan Kayqubad I's army, and its inhabitants were deported to Anatolia. However, it was recaptured within four months by the Ayyubid ruler al-Kamil. Sometime shortly thereafter, the citadel was slighted on al-Kamil's orders.

Mongol rule
In 1260, Urfa voluntarily submitted to the troops of Hulagu and thus came under Mongol rule. Because the city had surrendered peacefully, its inhabitants were spared.

The Mongols never garrisoned Urfa; it was near their western border with the Mamluk Sultanate and was probably seen as "too difficult to defend". Its ruined fortress was "probably not thought worth repairing". The city was desolate at this point; its inhabitants had evacuated or abandoned it and "only Turcoman nomads lived in the otherwise empty city".

Mamluk rule
The Mamluks gained control of Urfa sometime in the early 14th century. They renovated the ruined citadel probably during the third reign of an-Nasir Muhammad (1309–40), but the city "attracted few inhabitants". The Mamluk garrison only occupied the citadel itself; the surrounding city was still practically deserted and not worth committing any soldiers to defend. Located close to the Mamluks' eastern frontier, Urfa had "no commercial importance" because merchant traffic in Upper Mesopotamia was taking a route through Mardin and Ra's al-'Ayn rather than through Amid and Urfa.

That changed in the late 14th century, toward the end of the Mamluk period. Some commercial traffic had begun passing through Urfa en route to Aleppo, and the city became at least partly repopulated. By around 1400, al-Qalqashandi wrote that Urfa had been rebuilt and was prosperous again. Meanwhile, in 1394, Timur occupied Urfa without much resistance; he "admired the buildings and took away some of the portable wealth".

Aq Qoyunlu
The Aq Qoyunlu took over Urfa in the early 15th century. They apparently regarded it as a strategic military outpost on their western frontier. The citadel was again repaired, and the Hasan Paşa Camii may date to this period as well. The Aq Qoyunlu took it in perhaps the late 1410s or early 1420s. At some point, the Aq Qoyunlu ruler Kara Osman granted Urfa to his son Ali. But due to Ali's quarrels with his brothers beginning in autumn 1428, and the brothers wrote Kara Osman, Kara Osman got upset with Ali and relieved him of his post. Instead, he appointed one of the brothers, Habil, as governor of Urfa.

Ali left Urfa in 1429 and headed north, where he ended up besieging Harput. The governor of Harput wrote to the Mamluk sultan, al-Ashraf Barsbay, for assistance, offering to give him control of Harput in return. Barsbay agreed and began mustering an army in Damascus, but while his forces were still gathering Harput surrendered to Ali. With their primary objective undermined, the Mamluks decided to attack Urfa instead. This way, they could eliminate an Aq Qoyunlu base that could be used to attack Mamluk-held Aleppo.

One day before the main Mamluk army arrived, a "local Arab contingent" reached Urfa and fought a battle against Habil's Turkic forces. They were defeated. The Mamluk army arrived the next day and began a siege of the city. On 24 July, the citadel surrendered, and the Mamluks sacked the city. They demolished the fortress, enslaved the women and children who lived in the city, and killed many others. Habil himself was captured and taken to Egypt in chains. Contemporary historians compared the violent event to Timur's sack of Damascus in 1400.

About a decade later, Urfa was involved in the civil war between Ali Beg's son Jahangir and Jahangir's uncle Hamza for control of the Aq Qoyunlu. The contemporary historian Tihrani Isfahani wrote that Hamza's troops besieged Urfa but did not elaborate. Jahangir ended up making Urfa his main base at some point, from which he attacked Hamza in Erzincan and then later sent a raid against Ergani. Urfa was then the site of a battle in 1451, where Uzun Hasan successfully defeated other Aq Qoyunlu leaders shortly before gaining control of the tribal confederation as a whole. In 1462-3, under Uzun Hasan's reign, Urfa's citadel was renovated.

In early November 1480, a large Mamluk army under Yashbak min Mahdi, who was dawātdār-i kabīr or executive secretary to the Mamluk sultan Qaitbay, laid siege to Urfa. Yashbak bombarded the city walls with heavy cannon fire and used catapults to hurl fireballs into the city. This happened during the Islamic holy month of Ramadan, prompting Fazlallah Khunji Isfahani to liken Yashbak's actions to the tyrant Nimrod torturing the prophet Abraham with fire – also in Urfa, according to tradition. Aq Qoyunlu forces quickly arrived at Urfa from Diyar Bakr and, after a failed attempt at negotiations, a pitched battle took place. The Aq Qoyunlu army's right wing was commanded by Sulayman Beg Bijan and the left wing was commanded by Khalil Beg Mawsillu. The Mamluk forces were utterly defeated, and Yashbak was later executed.

Ottoman period

Urfa was probably first annexed to the Ottoman Empire under Selim I around 1517. The first extant Ottoman tax register for the city, compiled in 1518, counted 1,082 families (700 Muslim and 382 Christian) in Urfa, which probably meant a total population of just over 5,500 people. The low population was probably because of political upheaval in the region – particularly the ongoing conflict with Safavid Iran. By 1526, the city's population had increased to 1,322 families (988 Muslim and 334 Christian), meaning an estimated population of about 8,000.

Urfa experienced a renaissance under Ottoman rule. Industry and commerce picked back up, and its population rebounded, although it never reached the same population heights it had once held in the classical and early medieval periods. The high point lasted for about a century and a half, beginning with its conquest by the Ottomans. According to Mehmet Adil Saraç, Urfa's population first became majority Turkish sometime during this period, sometime between 1520 and 1570.

One important event that contributed to the upswing in commerce was Süleyman the Magnificent's successful Mesopotamian campaign against Safavid Iran in 1534–36, which took Baghdad and increased the security of trade routes in Urfa's region. By 1566, a tax register shows the city with an estimated 13,000 to 14,000 people (1,704 Muslim families and 866 Christian families). At this point, the city was described as having five large mahalles, each named after one of the five city gates, and it "must have had an active textile industry". A bedestan is also recorded.

Urfa's prosperity in the 1500s was based on both trade and agricultural production. In the countryside, there was a major "expansion of cultivated and inhabited land", resulting in abundant harvests reaching the city's markets. Meanwhile, the caravan trade continued to stimulate commercial activity – Urfa was an important entrepot on trade routes between Iran and Aleppo. 

Because of its prosperity, Urfa's population grew as it attracted residents from nearby cities. In 1571, a government report indicated that most of the government employees under the governor of Diyarbakır were actually living in Urfa instead. In 1586, Ottoman authorities created the Eyalet of Raqqa out of territories that had previously belonged to the Eyalet of Diyarbekir, and Urfa became "the center of economic and political power" in this new province.

At the same time, the city's prosperity attracted bandits and nomadic tribes. A report from October 1565 indicates that the wealthy, populous villages around Urfa were suffering from banditry, and another report from November 1588 indicates that there was a large-scale uprising of Bedouin tribes in the region. For most of the 1500s, this was mostly a rural problem; Urfa itself was mostly unaffected. That changed at the end of the century, when the revolt of Karayazıcı Abdulhalim turned Urfa into a battlefield.

Relatively little is known about Karayazıcı, but he was presumably a tribesman who worked as a bureaucrat in the local administration (Yazıcı means "scribe"). His army was recruited from other local tribal members. In 1599–1600 (1008 AH), Karayazıcı's army laid siege to the outer and then inner citadel and thus gained control of Urfa. The contemporary historian Mustafa Selaniki blamed Urfa's fall on the governors of Aleppo and Damascus failing to send reinforcements in time.

Karayazıcı's plan seems to have been to capture the citadel quickly in order to gain access to guns and ammunition that would enable his forces to resist Ottoman reinforcements. He set up a "quasi-state" based at Urfa's inner citadel, declaring himself sultan and Hüseyin Pasha (who had worked with him to capture the citadel) as grand vizier. Eventually, though, Ottoman troops (backed by reinforcements from Damascus and Aleppo) surrounded the inner citadel, dug trenches, and engaged the rebels in a bloody battle in the middle of the city. The rebels ran into ammunition shortages during the battle and had to melt down coins to use as bullets. Hüseyin Pasha was killed in the battle, but Karayazıcı himself managed to escape.

The instability accompanying the Celali revolts, and especially Karayazıcı's occupation of the city, must have sapped Urfa's prosperity. Several 17th-century accounts refer to parts of the town as being in disrepair. For example, when Jean-Baptiste Tavernier visited Urfa in 1644, "there were so many empty lots that [he] compared the town to a desert". The central Ottoman state's control of the surrounding Raqqa Eyalet weakened significantly in the early 1600s. Powerful ümera families from Urfa assumed responsibility for governance of the eyalet, while the actual office of governor was a sinecure for prominent Ottoman generals or their sons.

Urfa court records from about 1629 to 1631 (1039–40 AH) provide insight into local government during the Ottoman-Safavid War of 1623–1629. The Ottomans were in the process of mobilizing troops and resources in the area for the war effort, and the qadi of Urfa was responsible for billeting troops and gathering provisions. In August 1638, Sultan Murad IV stayed at Urfa along with his army while en route to Baghdad in the final campaign of the war. He ordered restoration work on the citadel, which is mentioned in written sources and confirmed by an inscription on the walls that still exists.

The most detailed account of early Ottoman Urfa was written by Evliya Çelebi, who visited the city in 1646. Part of his interest may have been because one of his relatives was a qadi here. His account mentions only three gates, with different names than those of the 1566 tax register. Evliya wrote that he counted 2,600 houses in the fortified part of the city, which probably indicates a population total similar to 1566. At this point, Urfa had houses generally made of mud brick; more opulent houses, belonging to paşas and qadis, had their own gardens and baths. Evliya also recorded 22 mosques, 3 medreses, and 3 zaviyes. He listed several hans, including the Yemiş Hânı, the Samsatkapısı, the Hacı İbrâhim Hânı, the Beykapısı Hânı, and the Sebîl Hânı. He also wrote that the city had 400 shops and several mills, including one named after one Tayyaroğlu Ahmed Paşa. However, he was apparently unimpressed by the city's shops and markets.

Evliya also wrote that Urfa had a tannery that produced high-quality yellow maroquin leather. Tavernier also noted the city's leather, saying that along with Tokat and Diyarbakır it produced some of the best maroquin leathers. Besides leather, Urfa was also renowned for its cotton fabrics during this period.

According to Onur Usta, part of why Urfa appeared to European visitors as "a derelict city with houses reduced to rubble" during this period was because it had a lot of residents from nomadic and tribal backgrounds. These people would have still engaged in nomadic transhumance activities during most parts of the year and "only needed a roof over their heads during the winter". The abandoned-looking houses would have belonged to them.

Information about Urfa during the 1700s is relatively scarce, but one source is the fiscal records of the new Rızvaniye Mosque. These document the waqf properties assigned to the mosque, including shops, gardens, mills, and public baths, as well as information about tenants and rents. There was a mulberry orchard in front of the medrese at this point, as well as a prosperous marketplace with little empty space available for rent.

Based on various fiscal and tax documents, it seems that Urfa suffered a series of troubles in the 1750s and began to sink into poverty. One of the most serious problems was rampant banditry, which both impeded agricultural production in surrounding rural areas and hindered economic recovery.

A serious outbreak of plague hit Urfa in the 1780s, and many people died. Iraqi Turkmen, particularly from the regions around Mosul and Kirkuk, were deported and resettled in Urfa to help repopulate the city. The connection with Kirkuk in particular left cultural and linguistic traces in Urfa, and some present-day Urfalis have described the two cities as having an "uncle-nephew relationship".

19th century

In the Ottoman period, Urfa was a center of commerce because of its location at a crossroads with Diyarbakır, Antep, Mardin, and Raqqa. Many Jewish, Armenian, and Greek merchants were present in Urfa, especially from Aleppo.

James Silk Buckingham visited Urfa in 1816 and ended up stuck there for a while because the roads were closed due to the ongiong Ottoman-Wahhabi War. Buckingham's account of early-1800s Urfa is one of the most informative of the late Ottoman period. By this time, the name "Urfa" had come to predominate, with only the city's Arab Christians still calling it "al-Ruha". The standard of living in Urfa had evidently increased since the 1600s – the mud brick houses recorded by Evliya Çelebi had given way to finer masonry structures that Buckingham compared to the houses of Aleppo. The houses described by Buckingham had harem and selamlik quarters separated by a courtyard, with the selamliks boasting "opulently furnished reception rooms" on their upper floors. Buckingham described the city as being divided into janissary and sharif factions, also like Aleppo. Many of the city's bazaars were closed due to the war, but Buckingham noted that Urfa had a thriving cotton trade during peacetime and observed some of the city's cotton printers at work. Coarser wool cloth and rugs were also manufactured in Urfa. 

In the mid-1800s, Urfa benefitted from a general increase in commercial activity in the region. Most of the larger courtyard houses in the present-day old town probably date from this period. The large Armenian church on the western main street was built in 1842 and many mosques were probably also built around this time. According to Suraiya Faroqhi, though, the city's population "must have been at a low ebb for several decades in the mid-century".

However, in the late 1800s, Urfa declined in importance as a commercial center. In particular, the opening of the Suez Canal in 1869 caused a major realignment of trade routes, shifting away from overland caravans and towards maritime commerce. As a result, the volume of commercial traffic coming through Urfa decreased markedly compared to previous periods and became increasingly local/regional in nature. The local economy shifted away from producing goods for export and toward meeting the basic needs of the local population. Workshops produced less in general during this period and their focus was more on cheap basic goods like local fabrics and household goods. Imports also declined because the locals were focusing more on consuming cheap basic goods rather than luxuries; they were living simpler, more frugal lives. Because people were using more local products, the cost of living also decreased and people had to work less to meet their expenses. Contemporary court records document that there was extensive commercial contact between Muslims and non-Muslims; they bought and sold goods freely between each other and entered into commercial partnerships together, indicating that there was relatively high trust between both groups.

The main centers of commercial activity in the Ottoman period were the bazaars, where both local and imported goods were bought and sold. Generally, a bazaar would be named after its primary function and main goods sold there. For example, the İsotçular Çarşısı was named because of the homemade chili peppers sold in this street. Among the bazaars mentioned in late 19th-century records: Kadıoğlu, Köroğlu, Eski Arasa, Teymurcu, Sarayönü, Belediye, Beykapı, Akar, Sipâhî, Bedestan, Hânönü, Kafavhâne, and Hüseyniye.

There was a huge increase in the number of hans recorded in the Aleppo Salnâmes in the late 1800s: from just 7 in 1867 to 11 in 1888, 18 in 1889, and 32 in 1898. According to Yasin Taş, this is because not only were new hans being built, but records were simply counting more types of commercial buildings as hans. Muslim and non-Muslim travelers would both use the same hans regardless of religion.

In the countryside surrounding Urfa, life went on largely unchanged. Most rural villagers were involved in agriculture, and farmlands were typically plowed using the same low-tech methods that had been used for thousands of years. Cows and oxen were kept as draft animals. Irrigated farmland around the Euphrates and some streams was more expensive than the waterless fields called "deştî land" which was not able to be irrigated. Irrigation channels were repaired jointly among the people who used the water. Sometimes there would be people living in the city (often non-Muslim) who would own farmland outside the city and deputize local villagers (often Muslim) to run the farm under the muzâraa contract. In 1846, taxes could not be collected because of drought and locusts. In 1861, 1863, and 1886, there were locusts; in 1870 there was a drought due to lack of rain.

Up until the mid-1890s, about 20,000 of the city's 60,000 residents were Armenians. In 1895, however, thousands of Armenians were killed in a series of massacres by both civilians and soldiers. First, in October, Turkish and Kurdish locals killed hundreds of Armenians over a two-day period. Then for two months the Armenian quarter was effectively subjected to a siege, with no food or water allowed in. The Turks claimed that the Armenians had a weapon cache, which they demanded in return for lifting the siege. In December, the siege ended when "a crowd of Turkish soldiers and civilians" entered the Armenian quarter and killed thousands of its inhabitants. About 3,000 survivors sought shelter in a nearby church – which is normally recognized as a place of refuge under Islamic law. However, soldiers burned the church to the ground, killing everyone inside. The troops went on to loot and burn the rest of the Armenian quarter. According to Lord Kinross, some 8,000 Armenians were killed in total.

There was a small but ancient Jewish community in Urfa, with a population of about 1,000 by the 19th century. Most of the Jews emigrated in 1896, fleeing the Hamidian massacres, and settling mainly in Aleppo, Tiberias and Jerusalem. There were three Christian communities: Syriac, Armenian, and Latin. The last Neo-Aramaic Christians left in 1924 and went to Aleppo (where they settled in a place that was later called Hay al-Suryan "The Syriac Quarter").

First World War and after

During the First World War, Urfa was a site of the Armenian and Assyrian genocides, beginning in 1915. Members of Urfa's Armenian community were deported and killed. In May, 18 families were deported from Urfa, and in June, 50 people were arrested, tortured, and then deported to Diyarbakır, where they were killed on the road. Urfa was also a stop on the deportation route, and the Urfa resistance in October was composed of Armenians deported from Van and Diyarbakır. Survivors from killings elsewhere had begun to arrive in Urfa, and by mid-August, massacres had begun in Urfa itself. Some 400 Armenians were taken to the edge of town and killed during a four-day period from 15–19 August. Another massacre took place on 23 September, when 300 Armenians were killed. 

In response to the Urfa resistance in October, Mehmet Celal Bey, who had served as governor of Aleppo before being sacked for refusing to comply with the order to deport the local Armenians, commented: "Each human has the right to live. A trampled worm will squirm and wriggle. The Armenians will defend themselves." The final event of the resistance was on 15 October, when several thousand Turkish troops attacked their position. The next day, some 20,000 Armenian deportees in transit were killed in and around Urfa.

Meanwhile, during the Russian occupation of Western Armenia, many Turks fleeing those regions came and settled in Urfa. Mehmet Adil Saraç estimates that around 8 to 10 thousand Turks migrated to the Urfa region this way.

At the end of the First World War, the Treaty of Sèvres assigned Urfa to the French-controlled Mandate of Syria, 5 km south of the border with Turkey. As a result, Urfa was occupied by British and then French troops. Locals from Urfa formed a militia and successfully drove out the occupying troops on 11 April 1920. The 1923 Treaty of Lausanne officially settled the matter by including Urfa as part of the new Republic of Turkey.

Under the new republic, Urfa was made capital of the new Urfa Province on 20 April 1924.

Urfa Halkevi was established on 23 February 1934, on a site that had earlier been occupied by a vocational school called the Mekteb-i Sanayi. The halkevi opened with only 7 branches: Language and Literature, Fine Arts, Representation, Sport, Social Assistance, Library and Publication, and Villagers. An eighth branch, People's Classrooms and Courses, was added in 1935. Throughout its existence, the Urfa Halkevi faced financial difficulties. It was eventually closed down when the halkevi program was abolished in 1951.

During this period, there were 7 newspapers in Urfa: the Urfa'da Milli Gazete ("National Gazette in Urfa"), Yeni Işık ("New Light"), Yenilik ("Newness"), Işık ("Light"), Urfa, Akgün ("White Day"), and İrfan ("Knowledge").

21st century
During the Syrian Civil War, thousands of Syrian refugees fled to Turkey, and many of them settled in Urfa. When Raqqa became the capital of the Islamic State, Urfa became a gateway for jihadists entering Syria because of its closeness to the Akçakale-Tall Abyad border crossing and to Raqqa itself. The city's general religious-conservative climate meant that many locals who adhere to Salafi thought sympathized with the Islamic State, and many of its members lived in the city as well.

On 6 February 2023 Urfa suffered some damage from the twin Turkey-Syria earthquakes.

Main sights

Urfa castle – built in antiquity, the current walls were constructed by the Abbasids in 814 AD.
 The legendary Pool of Sacred Fish (Balıklıgöl) where Abraham was thrown into the fire by Nimrod. The pool is in the courtyard of the mosque of Halil-ur-Rahman, built by the Kurdish Ayyubids in 1211 and now surrounded by the attractive Gölbaşı-gardens designed by architect Merih Karaaslan. The courtyard is where the fishes thrive. A local legend says seeing a white fish will open the door to the heavens.
 Rızvaniye Mosque – a more recent (1716) Ottoman mosque, adjoining the Balıkligöl complex.
 'Ayn Zelîha – A source nearby the historical center, named after Zulaykha, a follower of Abraham.
 The Great Mosque of Urfa was built in 1170, on the site of a Christian church the Arabs called the "Red Church," probably incorporating some Roman masonry. Contemporary tradition at the site identifies the well of the mosque as that into which the towel or burial cloth (mendil) of Jesus was thrown (see Image of Edessa and Shroud of Turin). In the south wall of the medrese adjoining the mosque is the fountain of Firuz Bey (1781).
 Ruins of the ancient city walls.
 Eight Turkish baths built in the Ottoman period.
 The traditional Urfa houses were split into sections for family (harem) and visitors (selâm). There is an example open to the public next to the post office in the district of Kara Meydan.
 The Temple of Nevali Çori – Neolithic settlement dating back to 8000BC, now buried under the Atatürk Reservoir, with some artefacts relocated above the waterline.
 Göbekli Tepe – The world's oldest known temple, dated 10th millennium BC (ca 11,500 years ago).

The citadel
Urfa castle is located on the rocky heights south of the historical city center. It is long and thin because it crowns a ridge.

The hilltop was the site of an Abgarid winter palace built in the 3rd century; the two columns are the only remnant of this palace. The first known fortification of the site dates from the early 6th century, under the emperor Justinian. Fortifications may have existed here previously, but if they did then they went unrecorded.

The fortress was generally well-maintained during the middle ages, and it withstood a number of attacks. It was destroyed on the orders of the Ayyubid sultan al-Kamil around 1235. In the early 1300s, it was rebuilt under the Mamluk sultan an-Nasir Muhammad. It was further renovated under the Aq Qoyunlu in the 1400s, and then again under the Ottomans at various points: under Suleiman the Magnificent in the 1500s and then under Murad IV in the early 1600s.

Urfa's castle was garrisoned with janissaries until their dissolution in 1826. It was already in serious disrepair by that point, though; only the part where the janissaries were posted was maintained at all. Afterwards, the citadel was essentially abandoned. In 1849, a local citizen named Sakıp Efendi dismantled part of the citadel and used the stones to build an inn and market; he also allegedly took a lot of stones to sell for money.

Old city walls

The monumental walls surrounding the old town date from the Abbasid-era rebuilding in 812. The only major repairs to them took place during the early Ottoman period, in 1660–61, when there was restoration work done on the city's fortifications in general. The walls are made of large stone blocks over 30 cm tall all the way through (i.e. not just on the faces). The early Ottoman repairs are distinguished by their small size, white color, and light bossing. In many places, people have built private houses directly adjoining the city wall's inner face, so that it forms one side of the house. Because of Urfa's location, the east wall was always the most exposed to attack; large chunks of the surviving sections here consist of Ottoman repairs.

There were three known gates in the city walls: the Harran Gate; the Bey Kapısı, or "Lord's Gate"; and the Saray Kapısı, or "Palace Gate". The Harran Gate, located near the southeast corner of the walled city, still exists; its outer face (outside the walls) was rebuilt at some point, possibly during the Ottoman renovations of 1660–61. Its inner face, however, dates back to the Ayyubid period, under the local ruler Muzaffar Ghazi Shihab ad-Din (1230–45). The inscription recording his name runs almost from one end of the gatehouse to the other; below it, and above the top of the arch, is a small relief of a double-headed eagle. 

The monumental Bey Kapısı, located on the east side of the old city, also still exists, although the actual gate no longer does. The original gatehouse was built in ancient times, perhaps during the 4th or 6th century. It probably had two large U-shaped towers with two or three gates in between them. Those two towers still exist today, although they were completely rebuilt over the centuries so that none of the original structures remain. The south tower kept its shape, but the north tower is now shaped like a polygon with straight sides. The entire gatehouse was turned into a fortress in the early middle ages. This may have happened during the Abbasid rebuilding of the city walls in 812, but in any case it had already happened by the early 11th century when sources refer to two castles in the city. The fortress consisted of a rectangular enclosure with the two towers on its east side; the north tower was probably rebuilt at this point. The fortress's entire eastern wall appears to have been moved back by about 12 m and the old gates were closed up in the process. The new gate was built at the northwest corner of the fortress, between it and the main city wall, so that there was a passage between them. At some point, this passage was blocked up. The Armenian prince Toros appears to have begun a rebuilding of the Bey Kapısı fortress, as attested by an Armenian inscription on the south tower, but this project was only finished under the crusaders. Later, during the Ottoman renovations of 1660–61, the fortress was rebuilt again. In the mid-1800s, the entire fortress was converted into a private residence, and rebuilding from this period has replaced most of the earlier masonry in many places.

As for the Saray Kapısı, it no longer exists, but it was originally located behind the bridge that takes Atatürk Caddesi over the river on the north side of town.

Balıklıgöl

According to legend, Balıklıgöl was formed by the prophet Abraham's confrontation with the tyrant Nimrod, who supposedly ruled over Urfa from the citadel above. When Abraham came of age, he destroyed Nimrod's idols, and in retaliation Nimrod "made a catapult out of the castle's twin pillars" and hurled Abraham into a pit of fire below. When Abraham landed, the flames miraculously turned into water, and the wood used to stoke the fire was turned into carp.

The carp are now called kutsal balıklar, or "sacred fish", and the spring water is believed to have healing properties. The fish are not eaten. According to legend, anyone who eats the carp will go blind. 

In ancient times, the pond and its carp were sacred to the fertility goddess Atargatis, or Tar'atha. With the shift in religion, the pond and its fish became associated with the prophet Abraham instead. This pond is mentioned in the late-4th-century account of the Christian pilgrim Egeria, who spent three days at Edessa and wrote that the fish were "shining and succulent". According to Drijvers, a temple to Atargatis once stood in this area.

There was a major effort to renovate the Balıklıgöl complex in the 1990s and turn it into a cultural heritage site, clearing out "noisy vernacular elements" and making it into a tidy, organized space. Before, the complex was run-down and crowded in by makeshift houses, which the authorities considered "an eyesore and a safety hazard" and were expropriated and demolished.

Balıklıgöl is associated with folk religious practices which, in recent decades, have become somewhat controversial with Muslim revivalists who "insist that such things have no place in Islam". For example, on Qadr Night (Kadır Gecesi), the night commemorating the first revelation of the Qur'an to Muhammad, tens of thousands of Muslims come to Balıklıgöl to "spend the night awake in communal worship". This practice may have its origins in the Christian ritual of incubation that was practiced in Christian Edessa. The city's mufti also brings out a glass case that supposedly contains Muhammad's beard (Sakal-ı Şerif), and people crowd around and try to touch or kiss it. According to local tradition, spending Qadr Night at Balıklıgöl three years in a row is equivalent to one pilgrimage to Mecca – although such a claim tends to be frowned upon by Muslim clerics.

Halil ür-Rahman Cami

The Halil ür-Rahman Cami, also called simply the Halil Cami, is a mosque and medrese located on the south side of the pool. Just south of the mosque is a cave which according to legend is where the prophet Abraham was born. Another tradition says that Abraham intended to sacrifice his son Isaac here, but sacrificed a goat instead; when he did, a spring gushed out, feeding the fish pool.

The earliest part of the complex is the minaret, which was built in 1211–12 under Ayyubid rule. There was presumably a mosque with a prayer hall on the site of the present one, which was completely rebuilt in 1819–20 (but probably similar to the original one). The other major component is a series of medrese "cells", fronted by a portico, which were built in 1808–09 and then renovated in 1871–72. The original Ayyubid complex may have been built to serve as a medrese, but by Ottoman times it was being used as a tekke with kitchens, reception rooms, and guest rooms, which may have been on the same site as the medrese cells. The tekke complex was converted into a medrese in the 1800s, possibly as soon as the medrese cells were built.

The mosque itself now serves as an antechamber where prayers can be said before entering the cave through a door on the south side. The mosque is entered through a domed vestibule on the west side. The prayer hall is a small squarish room with three aisles; two of them have groin-vaulted ceilings, while the middle one is topped with a dome. The mihrab is surrounded by an arch with squinches that seem to imitate Artukid style.

The minaret is a square tower that is visually divided into thirds by three molded cornices, one of which is at the very top. The upper level has pairs of mullioned windows on all four sides. The tops of the windows form horseshoe-shaped arches.

The medrese cells, now used as a Qur'an school, are elevated from the surrounding pavement. The cells are fronted by a portico with simple rounded arches. A balustrade with zigzag posts runs along the front of the portico. At the northwest corner of the pool is a five-sided room that projects out into the water on three sides. A restoration in the late 20th century extended the balustrade onto the top of the five-sided room.

Ayn Zeliha
The pool of Ayn Zeliha, named after Nimrod's daughter, is located south of the main pool. It is shaded by trees and surrounded by cafés.

Haleplibahçe museum complex

The Haleplibahçe museum complex (Turkish: Haleplibahçe Müze Kompleksi) is located near Balıklıgöl and occupies a 40-hectare area. It consists of two museums: the Şanlıurfa Museum and the Haleplibahçe Mosaic Museum. The Şanlıurfa Museum was originally founded in 1965 and moved to its present location in 2015. With over 34,000 square meters of indoor space, it is the largest museum in Turkey. It has 14 exhibition halls and 33 animation areas and houses some 10,000 artefacts from the Paleolithic through Islamic times. This includes finds from Göbekli Tepe, Harran, and the areas now inundated by the Atatürk Dam. As for the Haleplibahçe Mosaic Museum, it was built in situ on the top of where the Haleplibahçe mosaics were originally found. Among the mosaics on display here is the oldest known mosaic to depict the Amazons.

Kızılkoyun necropolis

Just to the east of the Haleplibahçe museum complex is the Kızıllkoyun necropolis, where at least 75 rock-cut cave tombs were carved into a limestone ridge during the Roman period, in the 3rd and 4th centuries. The tombs vary in size and design based on the socioeconomic status of their occupants, ranging from one to three rooms and some having special front entrances. Some of the tombs were also decorated with statues and mosaics.

In the 1970s, the Kızılkoyun area became occupied by informal squatter housing, which was later legitmized through construction amnesty in the 1980s. Nearby sites were designated as protected monuments, but the Kızılkoyun necropolis was not designated as anything until 2008 when it was declared as a second-degree archaeological site. In 2012, the necropolis was officially registered as the Yenimahalle Urban Archaeological Site, and 387 houses and workplaces on the premises were demolished. A new landscaping project was commenced in 2015.

Ulu Cami

The 12th-century Ulu Cami, or congregational mosque, was probably built on the site of an earlier Christian church, in this case possibly one dedicated to St. Stephen. The exact circumstances of the mosque's foundation are unknown — it may represent an expansion of an earlier mosque, or it may have been a new mosque foundation. The courtyard's west and east walls contain some ancient masonry. Several arches on the north wall were either part of an arcade in the old church or part of an associated building. The Ulu Cami is located on Divan Caddesi.

The courtyard itself is unusually elongated north-south. The main prayer hall is on the south side of the complex, while the minaret is at the northeast corner. A medrese is in the southeast corner, unusually projecting outward. The courtyard itself is slightly elevated and has two cemetery areas, both shaded by cypress trees.

The main prayer hall was probably built sometime after Nur ad-Din Zengi captured the city in 1146. It was later renovated in 1779. The interior consists of three long east-west aisles separated by low, thick columns. Each aisle has cross-vaulted ceilings. The mihrab and the dome above it are slightly off-center. The whole north face of the structure is fronted by a portico, which is possibly a later addition to the structure. Its ceiling is also cross-vaulted; the supporting columns are irregularly spaced.

The current medrese was built in the late 1700s on the site of an older one. The fountain at its southeast corner now contains an inscription commemorating the old medrese's construction in 1191, when the Ayyubids were ruling Urfa. Its construction was begun one Umar ibn Shahan ibn Ayyub, who may have been Saladin's cousin. Construction was finished under Umar's son Muhammad. This inscription used to be on the medrese's north wall, but was apparently moved to the fountain sometime after 1930.

The current medrese has its own mini-courtyard and consists of four rooms on the courtyard's south side plus a two-story building on the west side. This whole complex is now used as a school.

The minaret, like the main prayer hall, was probably built in the mid-12th century. It is a tall eight-sided tower with large windows on each side of the top floor, giving a commanding view of the city. These windows start at floor level and are partly walled up to protect the muezzin or others from falling. Other windows, much smaller and narrower, are arranged in vertical rows on the north, west, south, and east faces. The top floor is reached by a circular staircase. The minaret's roof was originally flat, but there is now a cube-shaped addition on top, crowned by a lead cupola and with a clock on each side.

An archaeological excavation in 1979 discovered a corridor underneath the Ulu Cami's prayer hall, beginning at its south face and extending north for about 6 or 7 meters before hitting a wall. The excavators hypothesized that this corridor would have then split into two parts and connected either to the old church's cellar or to underground catacombs.

Kapalı Çarşı

The Kapalı Çarşı is a "maze-like" covered bazaar area at the south end of Divan Caddesi, not far from Balıklıgöl. Its narrow streets are lined with shops and stalls selling a wide variety of goods: herbs and spices, many different types of fabric, "green Diyarbakır tobacco by the kilo", even guns. Household appliances are sometimes auctioned off here as well. The bazaar is covered are because of the climate: during the summer, the covers allow people to stay cool in the shade, while in winter they offer a bit of warmth.

The Kapalı Çarşı is one of the busiest shopping areas in the city; it serves locals and tourists as well as people coming from the surrounding villages to buy things in the city. It remains popular in spite of the increasing number of shopping malls in the city.

The Kapalı Çarşı is the most traditional marketplace in Urfa. Merchants gather and take part in a traditional prayer for "good and fruitful gain" two days per week when they open their shops as part of a "traders' prayer" that dates back to the culture of the Ahi guilds. Traditional artisans make goods for sale here, including shoes, saddles, and metal goods.

Among the bazaars located within the area: Kazaz (Bedesten), Sipahi Pazarı, Kınacı Pazarı, Bakırcılar Çarşısı (coppersmiths' market), Eskici Pazarı, Kuyumcular Çarşısı (jewellers' market), Kunduracılar Pazarı (shoemakers' market). The coppersmiths' bazaar is located south of the bedesten, along with the Haci Kamil Hanı, while the Sipahi Pazarı and the Hüseyniye bazaar are located further west. In the coppersmiths' and tin-beaters' quarter, there is "a vaulted street with shops down either side."

Gümrük Hanı

The Gümrük Hanı, or "customs caravanserai", is located in the middle of the Kapalı Çarşı. Variously dated to the late 16th century or the 18th or 19th centuries, it is a two-story building arranged around "a more or less square courtyard". The ground floor is occupied by shops opening up onto the courtyard. Above the shops on the upper level is a portico with access to rooms now used as private apartments. The shady courtyard is filled with tables belonging to teahouses and watch repairers. Just next door to the Gümrük Hanı is a bedestan.

Bedesten

One of the most important markets in the Kapalı Çarşı is the bedesten, which is located just south of the Gümrük Hanı. Originally built in 1562, it is mentioned as "bezzazistan" in the waqf of Rızvan Ahmet Paşa in 1740. It was restored in 1998 by the Şanlıurfa Culture, Art, and Research Foundation (ŞURKAV). It has gates to 4 surrounding bazaars.

Tabakhane Cami
The Tabakhane Cami, or "dyehouse mosque", dates from the 1700s or early 1800s. Its minaret, however, may be older – perhaps from the 15th or 16th centuries. The mosque's main prayer hall goes east-west, with a groin-vaulted portico on the north side. A rectangular courtyard surrounded by a high wall extends to the north. The main entrance to the whole complex is at the north end of the courtyard's west side, where there is a high and deep porch covered by a high semi-dome. The minaret is located at the east end of the portico; the şerefe at the top features carved designs interspersed with turquoise tiles.

Kara Meydanı
The Kara Meydanı is located at the north end of Divan Caddesi; north of here it becomes Sarayönü Caddesi. The 19th-century Yusuf Paşa Cami is located here, as is the old Haci Hafiz Efendi house, which is now restored and turned into an art gallery.

Parks

Akabe recreation area 
The Akabe recreation area (Akabe Mesire alanı), in Batıkent mahalle, covers 100,00 square meters and was implemented by the Metropolitan Municipality under mayor Zeynel Abidin Beyazgül under the slogan "a greener Şanlıurfa" ("Daha yeşil bir Şanlıurfa"); work completed as of December 2022. It has sports fields, playgrounds, walking trails, and an archery range.

Gallery

Religious significance 
According to some Jewish and Muslim sources, Urfa is Ur Kasdim, the hometown of Abraham, the grandfather of Jacob whom God named Israel. This identification was disputed by Leonard Woolley, the excavator of the Sumerian city of Ur in 1927 and scholars remain divided on the issue. Urfa is also one of several cities that have traditions associated with Job.

For the Armenians, Urfa has "great symbolic value" since it is believed that the Armenian alphabet was invented there.

Politics

Urfa is a stronghold of the governing Justice and Development Party and is sometimes called a "vote depot" for the party. 

From 2004 to 2014, Ahmet Eşref Fakıbaba served as mayor of Urfa for two terms. A popular figure in Urfa politics, Fakıbaba first rose to prominence as Chief Physician at the Şanlıurfa SSK Hospital, a role which he held for 11 years. In 2004 he ran as the AKP candidate in the mayoral election and won. The AKP did not nominate Fakıbaba as their mayoral candidate in the 2009 local elections, saying that they had 70% of the vote in Urfa and could win the election if their candidate was a jacket. However, Fakıbaba ran as an independent and won reelection to a second term. He later joined the Felicity Party before rejoining the AKP in 2013. In 2015, Fakıbaba was elected to the National Assembly as an AKP member, replacing previous Urfa MP Faruk Çelik. He later resigned as MP in 2022.

Demographics

History
The ethnic and religious demographics of the city have shifted over the centuries and were largely diverse. In ancient times, the region was mixed with Greeks, Arabs, Syrians, and Armenians. At the time of the First Crusade, the majority of the population were either Armenian or Assyrian. 

In 1910, Ely Bannister Soane wrote that that apart from Turkish effendis, Urfa was populated by Arabs, Kurds and a large number of Armenians. British forces reported a mixed pre-war population of Kurds, Turks and 7,500 Armenians. According to 1918 reports of the Urfa mutasarrifate, there were 33,000 Turks, 27,000 Kurds, 12,000 Arabs, 5,500 Armenians, 3,000 Assyrians, and 500 Jews in the central kaza.

The Armenian and Assyrian Genocides, undertaken by Ottoman troops and Ottoman-sponsored militias such as the special organisation, led to the slaughter, deportation, and ethnic cleansing of much of the Christian population of Urfa and the surrounding region. Following the establishment of the Republic of Turkey, most of the remaining non-Muslim population left the city due to continued persecution.

Language 
In the early 19th century, the dominant language of the city was Turkish, while Armenian, Syriac, Kurdish, Arabic, and Persian were also spoken. Armenians were observed to speak Turkish to strangers, while Assyrians spoke Arabic.

Present-day 
Today, the city is mainly composed of Arabs and Kurds as well as Turks.

Syrian refugees 

Since the outbreak of the Syrian Civil War, large numbers of refugees from Syria have settled in Urfa because of its closeness to the border and opportunities for employment. As of 2017, as many as 300,000 Syrians live in Urfa, out of the total population of 750,000 in the province. As of 2014, about 79% of Syrian refugees in Urfa were Arabic-speakers, while the other 21% were Kurdish-speakers.

In general, Syrians in Urfa have clustered in areas where home rental prices are lower; typical rents range from 600 to 900 liras (as of 2019). These homes are often small, and often more than one nuclear family shares the same residence, so a 100-140-square-meter may accommodate 6–17 people. Syrians with the lowest incomes are most heavily concentrated in run-down neighborhoods with a lot of squatting that were previously inhabited mostly by poor people who had moved to Urfa from the countryside. Often, they are in outlying neighborhoods far from the city center. The largest number of Syrians in Urfa are in the Haliliye district, where they are especially concentrated in the neighborhoods (mahalles) of Devteşti, Ahmet Yesevi, Süleymaniye, Bağlarbaşı, Şehitlik, Cengiz Topel, Şair Nabi, Yeşildirek, İpekyolu, Sancaktar, İmam Bakır and Yavuz Selim. The second-highest concentration is in Eyyübiye, whose neighborhoods (mahalles) with the highest concentrations of Syrians are Eyyüpnebi, Hayati Harrani, Eyüpkent, Akşemsettin, Yenice, Muradiye, Direkli and Kurtuluş. In both cases, the Syrians here tend to prefer single-story residences where rents are not too high. The third urban district of Urfa, Karaköprü, has a much smaller Syrian presence. This area has been built up significantly in recent decades, with lots of luxury multi-story residences with high rents preferred by middle- and high-income residents. The Syrians who live here mostly had relatively high pre-war incomes. They are clustered in Maşuk, Karşıyaka, Akbayır and Şenevler. As of 2014, the largest concentrations of Syrians in the city were in the mahalles of Hayati Harrani (165 families), Bağlarbaşı (115), Devteşti (105), Ahmet Yesevi (91), and Eyyüpnebi (90 families).

Syrian refugees in Urfa often struggle with financial difficulties and unemployment. The language barrier hinders integration into the surrounding community, and many Syrians tend to form their own communities and interact less with Turkish locals. Many Syrians in Urfa run their own businesses; workplaces belonging to Syrian refugees are clustered around Şehit Nusret Caddesi and Atatürk Boulevard, Sarayönü and Divanyolu Streets, and Haşimiye Meydan. Many Syrians are also self-employed as street vendors, selling food, clothes, toys, and other items.

Before 2017, relations were relatively friendly between Syrians and Turks, but after 2017 relations began to deteriorate as there was a growing perception among Turks that Syrians were to blame for economic stagnation. The rapid increase in Syrian-owned businesses in Urfa, depressed wages for workers, and a perception of Syrians are "cheap labor"  have all contributed to anti-Syrian sentiment among Turks. Some Turks also resent the fact that Syrian refugees have free access to healthcare and education. In July 2019, local authorities removed all Arabic-language signs on Syrian-owned businesses in Urfa and made Turkish-language signs mandatory.

Economy 

The average per capita income in Urfa is $4,400 USD per year. Unemployment in Urfa is 18%, among young people it is 35%.

Urfa is a center of footwear production in the region, and around 5,000 people are employed in this sector. The Istanbul-based shoe retailer FLO, owned by the Ziylan Group, opened a shoe factory in Urfa in 2012. As of 2018, this factory employed 900 people and was the largest footwear factory in the region, producing 1.8 million pairs of shoes per year. FLO was planning to open a second factory, employing 1,500 more people, in the city in early 2019. According to the province governor Abdullah Erin, there were also plans to open some 13 more shoe factories in the Organized Industrial Zone by 2023, employing as many as 20,000 people and producing 30 million pairs of shoes annually.

Urfa is a major producer of pistachio nuts, with 29.7 million trees in the whole province producing 38,576 tons of pistachios in 2021. However, most processing is done in Gaziantep, which is the other main pistachio producer in Turkey. Both cities' pistachios have geographical indications under different names for different cultivars, with Urfa's officially known as the "Urfa flax village pistachio" (Urfa keten köyneği fıstığı).

Handicrafts
Urfa has a rich tradition of handicrafts: coppersmiths, furriers, weavers and carpetmakers, felt makers, saddle makers, and jewelers all form part of this tradition. Historically, the various trades had their own bazaars where artisans sold their wares. In the 21st century, however, these handicrafts have been on the decline, and new generations are generally not learning them. 

Coppersmithing is relatively prosperous among Urfa's handicrafts, although demand has fallen in favor of more contemporary decor. Many coppersmiths have left the profession altogether, and those who remain often face declining incomes. Jewelry making also remains a thriving business; its continued importance is partly because of traditional wedding customs that are still practiced. The making of prayer beads (tespih) also continues in Urfa, with craftsmen working particularly around the Gümrük Han and the shopping areas around Balıklıgöl. Woodcarvers, although few in number, are still in demand for restoration of old buildings. A few furriers and saddle makers also continue to ply their trades in the city.

Artisanal leather tanning, on the other hand, is no longer practiced in Urfa, and new apprentices are not taught. Professionals now send the hides to industrial-scale leather factories instead. Commercial production of handmade embroidery has also ceased in Urfa, although many women continue the craft for dowry purposes.

Limestone quarrying 

There is an abundance of limestone in the Urfa area, and it has been quarried extensively since ancient times for use as a building material. This limestone, known as Urfa limestone, was mostly deposited in Eocene through Miocene times (about 56-5 million years ago).
It has a light, whitish-yellow ochre color. When freshly extracted from the quarry and still rather moist, Urfa limestone is relatively soft and can easily be cut with a handheld saw. Once exposed to the atmosphere, though, its surface gradually hardens so that it makes a suitably strong building material.

Urfa limestone has been quarried for human use since at least the Neolithic period: it was the main building material used at Göbekli Tepe, 12,000 years ago, and the prehistoric quarries and workshops at Göbekli Tepe are among the oldest in the world. On the southern edge of the rocky plateau, there are also traces of quarries dating back to ancient Roman times.  Many old quarries in the area were also dug underground, forming artificial caves. The oldest of this type is the massive 4-story Basda quarry, although its precise age is unknown.

A number of active limestone quarries exist today in the Urfa area. Much of the quarrying is done just west of the city, around the Evren Industrial Estate.

Şanlıurfa province's total limestone reserves amount to 62.2 million tons, and its industry has an annual processing capacity of 31,680 tons. Many of the stone blocks quarried from the Urfa area are sent to Mardin and Midyat for processing.

Before the introduction of reinforced concrete structures, Urfa limestone was the main building material used for "major" construction projects in the area. Many historical structures in the city were built with this limestone: the castle and city walls, the Ulu Cami, the Halil ür-Rahman and Rızvaniye mosques, and the Gümrük Hanı, as well as many of the old 18th- and 19th-century houses in the old town. It is also used in many contemporary buildings, such as the Mevlana mosque complex. Especially since the start of the GAP in the 1980s, regional demand for Urfa limestone as a construction material has been increasing, particularly since it is cheaper than reinforced concrete. It is also commonly used in combination with other building materials, such as aerated concrete and pumice blocks. In addition to being used as a building block, Urfa limestone is also used for cladding on the outside of walls, as well as decorative finishings on indoor walls. Its use is mostly regional; it is not used much outside the area.

Industrial zones

Organized Industrial Zone
The Organized Industrial Zone (Turkish: Organize Sanayi Bölgesi) is located 17 km west of central Urfa on the highway to Gaziantep. Construction started in 1991. The site consists of three areas covering over 1,700 hectares as of 2018. It is home to about 250 companies and employs about 13,000 people.

Evren Industrial Estate
The Evren Industrial Estate (Turkish: Evren Sanayi Sitesi) is a Small Industrial Site located about 7 km west of central Urfa on the highway to Gaziantep. It covers about 140 hectares and is home to about 1500 businesses. It became operational in 1994. Urfa's limestone quarries are also clustered around here.

Culture

Cuisine 

As the city of Urfa is deeply rooted in history, so its unique cuisine is an amalgamation of the cuisines of the many civilizations that have ruled in Urfa . It is widely believed that Urfa is the birthplace of many dishes, including Çiğ köfte, that according to the legend, was crafted by the Prophet Abraham from ingredients he had at hand. Another legend attributes its creation to a nameless hunter's wife who, when her husband brought home a gazelle he'd killed, was unable to find firewood to cook it with because Nimrod had gathered all the wood for throwing Abraham into the fire. She improvised and took some lean meat from the gazelle's thigh, crushed it up, and mixed it with bulgur, red pepper, and salt, and then added parsley and green onions and served it raw.

Meat-based dishes are a staple of everyday meals in Urfa. There is a local saying, "There is no trouble where meat comes in" (Turkish: et giren yere dert girmez). Foods like lahmacun and kebab are consumed daily by many people. Ciğer kebabı, or liver kebab, is especially popular among poorer Urfalis, since liver is usually a relatively cheap meat. Liver kebab is popularly eaten for either breakfast, lunch, or dinner.

The walnut-stuffed Turkish dessert crepe (called şıllık) is a regional specialty. According to legend, its sweet syrup was first made using molasses from the Hanging Gardens of Babylon.

Urfa's local variety of cheese, known as "Urfa cheese" (Turkish: Urfa peyniri), is similar to cheeses from other nearby cities, such as Diyarbakır, Maraş, and Gaziantep. Although there is no single standardized way of producing it, it is typically made from sheep or goat milk and aged for anywhere from 3 to 7 months.

Some other specialties of Urfali cuisine include şöşbörek, tirit (a meal which, according to the medieval historian al-Tabari, was first made by the prophet Abraham), the appetizer "içli köfte", the dessert zerde, the beverage Urfa biyanbalısı, the biscuit külünçe, the soup lebeni çorbası, and a number of other dishes: Urfa ekşilisi, frenk çömleği, haşhaş kebabı, kazan kebabı, keme boranısı, kıymalı söğürme, Urfa kıymalısı, Urfa miftahi tas kebabı, pancar boranısı, eggplant kebab, saç kavurma, onion kebab, su kabağı yemeği, egg meatballs (yumurtalı köfte), üzmeli pilav, and isot pot (isot çömleği).

The Şanlıurfa Traditional Cuisine Museum (Şanlıurfa Geleneksel Mutfak Müzesi), located in the old Hacıbanlar house, is dedicated to the local cuisine.

Hospitality 
Urfali society traditionally places a great value on hospitality, and inviting guests over and sharing food with them has a special importance. Locals attribute this to the prophet Abraham, who according to legend never dined alone — he always had guests over to share his meals with. The locally common epithet "Halil İbrahim Sofrası" ("the tablecloth-like") depicts this characterization.

Sıra night
Although not strictly unique to Urfa, the Sıra night is a custom strongly associated with Urfa. A Sıra night is an evening gathering of male friends at the host's house, where the participants dine and converse together. Games and music are also played. Typically, a group of friends will organize a sıra night once per week. Any one of the friends can invite a guest of his own; the guest is brought to the upper part of the room where the event is being held, and the friend who invited him introduces him to the group.

Çiğ köfte typically forms the main course of these meals, which typically begin with a retelling of the dish's legendary origins. Çiğ köfte is hardly the only dish served, though — a wide range of foods, in any combination, may be served. Lahmacun, tirit, içli köfte, isot çömleğ, şıllık, halva, and many different soups, pilafs, kebabs, meats, and other dishes are just a few of the potential items that the sıra night's host may offer. At the end of the meal, bitter coffee called mırra is served in special handleless cups.

Today, the sıra night has expanded to become a recreational and touristic activity, open to both men and women. There are guesthouses in Urfa, often located in old historic mansions, that organize their own sıra nights for guests.

Literature 
Urfa has a long history of literature, going back to early Christian writers such as Bardaisan and Ibas of Edessa. A prominent medieval writer from Urfa was the 9th century Arabic author al-Ruhawi, whose Adab al-Tabib covered the topic of medical ethics. Later, from the 1600s to the 20th century, divan poetry became popular in Urfa. The popularity of divan poetry in Urfa is unusual because, by the 1600s, Urfa was not a major center of learning that would typically be expected to produce a lot of poetry. In all, 130 different Urfali poets are known from this period. A few of them are Nâbî, Ömer Nüzhet, Admî, Fehim, Hikmet, Şevket, Sakıb, and Emin. Many of them were Sufis, affiliated with orders like the Bektashis, Mevlevis, Naqshbandis, Qadiris, and Rifa'is; they gathered in places like the Hasanpaşa Medrese, the İhlasiye Medrese, the Hasan Paşa Medrese, the Sakıbiye Tekke, the Halil’ür Rahman Medrese, the Rızvaniye Medrese, the Dabbakhane Medrese, and the Eyyübî Medrese. Urfali divan poets almost exclusively used the ghazala form, with almost no known examples of the qasida.

In modern times, some of the prominent authors based in Urfa include A. Rezzak Elçi, Abdurrahman Karakaş, Ali Fuat Bilkan, Arif İnan, Bekir Urfalı, Celal Oymak, Cuma Ağaç, Faruk Habiboğlu, Fedli Keser, Fuat Rastgeldi, Halil Güçlü, Hanifi Düşmez, Hicri İzgören, Hüseyin Baykuş, H. Sami Nacar, İ. Halil Aycan, İ. Halil Baran, İbrahim Tezölmez, Kemal Oğuzlu, Mehmet Adil Oymak, Mehmet Bayırhan, Mehmet Emin Ercan, Mehmet Hazar, Mehmet Kurtoğlu, Meral Dalaman, Misbah Hicri, Mustafa Dişli, Müslüm Akalın, Müslüm Yücel, Necati Siyahkan, Necdet Karasevda, Nejat Karagöz, Osman Erkan, Osman Güzelgöz, Sabri Çepik, Serhat Sever, Seyyit Ahmet Kaya, Siraç Suman, Şükrü Alğın, Veysel Polat, Suut Kemal Yetkin, Mustafa Yazgan, Bekir Yıldız, and Mustafa Acar. There have also been authors who were born in Urfa but have worked elsewhere; they include Yılmaz Karakoyunlu, Aysel Özakın, Aydın Hatipoğlu, Akif İnan, Ragıp Karcı, İhsan Sezal, Atilla Maraş, Abdülkadir Karahan, Günel Altıntaş, and Sedat Şanver.

Traditional house architecture 

Urfa's old town has many old courtyard houses; a lot of them date back to the 1800s. A typical Urfa courtyard house is centered around a high-walled courtyard that is closed to the street. Facing the courtyard is a porticoed antechamber covered by a roof and partially surrounded by three walls. In Urfa, the name for this space is mastaba; elsewhere, the more general term is iwan. There are also various other rooms with various purposes, such as bedrooms, a kitchen (tandir), a sitting room, or a water closet. There is also a semi-basement called the zerzembe, which is used for winter food storage and is practically omnipresent in traditional Turkish homes in a hot climate. The house as a whole, with its courtyard, mastaba, and other rooms, forms one integrated living space rather than each room being its own "isolated, independent" space.

Together, the courtyard and mastaba form the most important part of the house. Except in very cold weather, most family activities would traditionally take place here. In particular, the courtyard is where women would traditionally gather to visit with each other during the day, while doing household tasks like lacework, knitting, or sewing, and moving about to whichever part of the courtyard was shaded. The courtyard's importance is such that in Turkish it is often called hayat — literally, "life". For privacy, the courtyard is surrounded by high walls to prevent prevent passersby from looking in from the street. For the same reason, it is not entered directly from the street; instead, the front door leads to the dehliz, or entrance hall, where a second door opens onto the courtyard. Inside the courtyard, there is often a fountain and small garden. As for the mastaba, it is usually the grandest and most architecturally elaborate part of the house. It is an attractive place for people to sit because, in Urfa's hot climate, it remains relatively cool (so it is also called the "summer mastaba").

Traditional Urfa courtyard houses are often two-story. Rooms on the ground floor are called kab, after a regional word meaning "arch vault". Rooms on the upper floor are called çardak, or "arbor", and all open onto the gezenek, an open terrace accessed by stairs from the courtyard. Each room is internally divided into two parts: the entry space, called the gedemeç or papuçluk, and the main room space. Shoes must be removed in the gedemeç before proceeding to the main area. The main area is typically raised by about 20–30 cm above the gedemeç.

Urfa gets very hot in the summer, and it is often cooler to sleep on the roof than in the house. As a result, the roof is typically crowned by a parapet built high enough to protect the family's privacy.

An important consideration in domestic architecture is mahremiyat, which could roughly be translated into English as "privacy" or "intimacy" but which carries stronger implications. This concept is especially important when it comes to relations between men and women – outside the extended family, interaction between men and women is restricted. As a result, traditional Urfa houses are constructed in ways to prevent men outside from viewing the women of the household. For example, doors facing each other, windows facing the street, and significant differences in roof elevation are all avoided.

In wealthier households, the house would be built with separate haremlik and selamlik quarters; poorer and middle-class houses would not have this luxury. The haremlik is where the family lives; the selamlik is a "semi-public" space used to host male guests and shelter animals. The haremlik is generally larger and "better equipped" than the selamlik, since it is where most everyday family life is conducted. In larger houses, the selamlik may have its own courtyard, smaller than the haremlik's. The selamlik never has a second story since that would allow male visitors to see into the haremlik courtyard from above. In some houses there is a second floor above the selamlik, but it belongs to the haremlik and can only be accessed through that part of the house. In larger homes, the selamlik may also have its own separate entrance.

These courtyard houses are often built facing south, as this is the qibla direction here. Their water closets are typically tucked out of the way of the kitchen and oriented so that when they are used, a person's intimate parts on either the front or back are not facing the qibla.

Some distinct features of Urfa houses are separate summmer and winter porticos (mastabas), microclimactic features to control heat, the multifunctionality of all the spaces, the fact that they can be used for daytime or nighttime activities, and the fact that men and women use the same areas so the house is not generally construtted with separate quarters for men and women.

Local Turkish dialect 
The Turkish spoken in Urfa has some features in common with the variety of Iraqi Turkmen spoken in Kirkuk, as well as some features owed to Arabic influence. For example, the Arabic sounds 'ayn, ghayn, and qāf are pronounced the same in Urfa as they are in Arabic, which is not done in standard Turkish.

As another example, Urfa Turkish has somewhat irregular vowel harmony compared to standard Turkish due to influence from Arabic. For example, standard Turkish has some words that do not conform to the usual vowel harmony patterns, such as elma ("apple") or anne ("mother"). In Urfa pronunciation, these words are regularized to follow vowel harmony — for the examples given, they become alma and ana, respectively. However, the reverse is always true — vowel harmony in certain other standard Turkish words gets broken in Urfa speech. For example, kebap becomes kübap and hamam becomes hemam in Urfa pronunciation. These shifts do not seem to follow any particular pattern.

The present-tense suffix -yor is contracted to -y in Urfa Turkish. For example, istiyorum ("I want") becomes istiyem. There are also other miscellaneous cases of sounds being elided in certain words: for example, standard Turkish avukat ("lawyer") becomes abkat in Urfa pronunciation, dakika ("minute") becomes dekke, and mahalle ("neighborhood") becomes mehle.

In some words, sounds are epenthesized (added to): for example, standard Turkish fırsat ("opportunity") becomes fırsant in Urfa pronunciation, gibi ("like, such as") becomes gibin, and elbet ("of course") becomes helbet.

Education

Harran University 

Harran University was established in Urfa in 1992 as an amalgamation of several different faculties that had previously been attached to two different universities. The first of these was the Vocational School, which had been established in 1976 as a subordinate of Dicle University in Diyarbakır and was the first institute of higher learning in Urfa. Also attached to Dicle University were the Faculty of Agriculture (established in 1978) and the Faculty of Engineering (established in 1984). Gaziantep University had also established a Faculty of Theology in Urfa in 1988. With the foundation of Harran University, these departments were all brought together under a single organization. Several new faculties were also created at the same time: the Faculty of Arts and Sciences, the Faculty of Medicine, the Institute of Social Sciences, and the Institute of Science and Health Sciences.

Since 1992, a number of additional departments have been added to the university. It now comprsises 14 faculties, 4 "schools" (Turkish: Yüksekokul), 3 institutes, and 13 vocational schools. The Şanlıurfa Vocational School was split in two in 2011, one focusing on technical sciences and the other focusing on social sciences. The other vocational schools under the university's rectorate are all located in other towns, as are the Siverek Faculty of Applied Sciences and the Viranşehir School of Health. Also under the university's banner is the State Conservatory, which was established in 2011.

Former vocational schools

Mekteb-i Sanayi 
By 1906, the presence of a vocational school in Urfa called the Mekteb-i Sanayi is attested. It was used as a hospital for wounded fighters during the Turkish War of Independence. This school stayed open after the war and is attested again in 1927, by then under the name of Urfa Male Industry School (Urfa Erkek Sanayi Mektebi). This school's building was demolished in the late 1930s and the Halkevi building was built on its site.

Urfa Girls' Institute 
The Urfa Girls' Institute (Turkish: Urfa Kız Enstıtüsü), which opened in 1942, was an early vocational school teaching practical trades and general subjects to girls and young women. Its students were girls from ages 12 to 17 who had graduated primary school (up to 19 for specialized classes). The curriculum covered five years and was divided into two levels: the first three grades were secondary-level, general-knowledge courses for primary school graduates; while the last two were post-secondary-level and specifically for technical education. The general education classes included subjects such as science, mathematics, history, geography, Turkish, French, bookkeeping, physical education, and music. Once the student completed these three years, she was considered a secondary school graduate and could proceed to the two years of post-secondary education. This was also open to students who had completed secondary school elsewhere. The main specialized branches were sewing and fashion; individual classes also included artificial flowers, embroidery, childcare and health information, cooking, and housekeeping. 

At the end of every academic year, there was an exhibition featuring the students' work, including sewing, embroidery, dresses and other clothes, hats, artificial flowers, and painting. Journalist Ekrem Erden wrote about one exhibition in 1954 which was visited by 1500 people a day and featured dresses, hats, coats, men's and women's shirts, blouses, nightgowns, and pajamas. During the school year the school also put on fashion shows also featuring students' creations. The schools would also accept orders from customers as part of their practical lesson plans, and then give students a share of the profits; this was to help accustom them to business life and also to provide them with some money as well. The teachers were mostly female; there were only a handful of male teachers. 

The Girls' Institute also had an evening school, which was open to women up to the age of 45, regardless of educational background; they attended classes once or twice per week, with 6 hours of classes per week in total. Students between the ages of 17 and 25 formed the single largest student demographic at the evening school, but younger and older students were also not uncommon.

When the Girls' Institute first opened in 1942, there was no separate building for it; the lessons were held at the İnönü Primary School in the meantime. The school's first academic year was 1942–43 and there were 12 students (8 secondary and 4 post-secondary) along with 26 evening school students. According to Necla Alpan, one of the school's early students, this low number was because of the societal prejudice against sending girls to school. The journalist and author Ahmet Naci İpek, who was a primary school student at the time, later recalled that many of the fathers were forbidding and did not want their daughters to attend school, saying things like "What will happen if a girl reads?" On the other hand, he also recalled that many of the mothers, who had been confined to domestic life, were enthusiastic about the school's opening and hoped their daughters could gain knowledge and independence, and pushed back against their husbands' reluctance. A local newspaper article from February 1947 wrote that teachers were disappointed by the low number of students: from Urfa's population of about 40,000 at the time, the paper estimated that one could expect some 300–400 students at the Girls' Institute, but just 67 girls actually attended the school for the 1946–47 academic year. The paper attributed this to people not wanting to send their daughters to school.

The Girls' Institute program continued until the 1974–75 academic year, when they were reworked into the Girls' Vocational High School (Turkish: Kız Meslek Lisesi). The archive of the Urfa Girls' Institute is now in the archive of the Bahçelievler Vocational and Technical Anatolian School (Bahçelievler Mesleki ve Teknik Anadolu Lisesi).

Urfa Institute of Art for Boys 
The boys' equivalent to the Girls' Institute was Urfa Institute of Art for Boys (Turkish: Urfa Erkek Sanat Enstıtüsü), which provided vocational education to boys aged 12 to 17. The objective was to teach them the skills needed to become skilled workers and artisans.

The Institute had three main branches: woodworking, blacksmithing, and leveling. Other subjects were also taught at the school, including Turkish, citizenship, history, geography, mathematics, physics, "general technology", chemstiry, "collective courses", physical education, health science, decorative painting, and "applied mechanics and tools". Like other Institutes in Turkey, education at the Urfa Institute of Art for Boys was divided into two phases: the Male Middle Art School, covering the first three years and the Male Art Institute, covering the last two years. After completing the first three years, students had to pass an exam in order to receive a diploma as a graduate of the Male Middle Art School. If they wished to continue their education and training, they could then move on to the Male Art Institute. Again, after completing this period there was an exam that students had to pass in order to receive a diploma as a graduate of the Urfa Male Art Institute. 

The institute's students also took part in performing arts like music and theatre, and gave performances in front of audiences. These were done for various reasons, including social activities among students, as well as helping students who were struggling financially.

In the 1940s, there was a general opening of Art Schools for Boys in Turkey. The Urfa Institute of Art for Boys opened on 30 October 1944, as the Urfa Male Middle Art School (Turkish: Urfa Erkek Orta Sanat Okulu), during a general wave of opening vocational schools for boys in Turkey in the 1940s. The school's opening was presided over by Urfa governor Feyyaz Bosut. For the 1947–48 academic year, the school was expanded into the Male Art Institute with the addition of "circuit classes".

Urfa was severely lacking in educational institutions during this period, and the opening of the Institute helped fill that need. At the time of its opening in 1944, there was only one other secondary school in the city. However, Turkey was under the wartime economy of World War II at the time, and lingering economic effects continued even after the war's end in 1945. The school's expansion into the Male Art Institute in 1947 was hindered by a lack of funds. In 1954, newspaper columnist Ekrem Erden wrote that the school was still unable to expand and was having tool shortages. As late as 1958, the school's carpentry workshop was still unfinished, forcing students to work in the halls.

Today, the school's archive is part of the Urfa Vocational and Technical Anatolian High School (Urfa Mesleki ve Teknik Anadolu Lisesi)'s archive.

Health

Old state hospital 
The old state hospital in Urfa was established by Ethem Bey in 1903 and became a public hospital in 1943. This hospital eventually came to comprise four different buildings, serving as the A, B, C, and D blocks. The A-block building, which was three stories tall, opened in 1962 and was originally dedicated to treatment of tuberculosis. The B-block building opened in 1972 and had 200 beds. The D block was for emergency care. Demolition of the old state hospital, which was located in Atatürk mahalle of Haliliye district, was completed in 2022. At the time of the demolition, the provincial health directorate was planning to build a new 150-bed children's hospital on the site.

Şanlıurfa Balıklıgöl State Hospital 
The Şanlıurfa Balıklıgöl State Hospital (Şanlıurfa Balıklıgöl Devlet Hastanesi) was established in 1963 as a "Health Station" (Sağlık İstasyonu), and then became a dispensary in 1975. In July 1983, it became the Şanlıurfa SSK Hastanesi and was operating as an inpatient facility with 150 beds. In addition, a 5-story outpatient department building began construction in 1991 and then became operational in 1994. It was renamed in 2005 to its current name.

Şanlıurfa Training and Research Hospital 
The Training and Research Hospital (Şanlıurfa Eğitim Ve Araştırma Hastanesi) was established in 1973 with 125 beds. Originally, it was a branch hospital under the State Hospital, until 1984. From 1984 until 2004, it was a gynecology and pediatric hospital, and in 2004 it was split in two: the gynecology and obstetric hospital, which remained in the same building, and the pediatric hospital, which moved into the old State Hospital building. In 2016, the two branch hospitals were combined together into the Training and Research Hospital in the current building due to a shortage of beds. The current building, as of 2019, covers over 100,000 square meters and has 400 patient rooms (with separate beds and restrooms), 18 operating rooms (2 of which are set aside for "maternity emergencies"), a 180-person conference hall, and an 80-person training hall, as well as a helipad and a parking lot with 1,200 spaces. The hospital covers gynecology, pediatric, and adult healthcare.

Mehmet Akif İnan Training and Research Hospital 
The Mehmet Akif İnan Training and Research Hospital (Mehmet Akif İnan Eğitim ve Araştırma Hastanesi) opened in 2004 and handles as many as 3,500 to 6,000 patient applicants per day. It has 500 beds (rooms have 1, 2, or 3 beds, as well as their own restrooms) and a conference hall that can seat 156 people. There is a blood center, a dialysis unit, and an intensive care unit, as well as a physical therapy unit for outpatients.

Transport

Şanlıurfa GAP Airport is located about 34 km (21 mi) northeast of the city and has direct flights to Istanbul, Ankara and Izmir.
Construction of the first phase of a planned four-route, 78 km network of trolleybus lines began in late 2017, and the first of 10 bi-articulated trolleybuses built by manufacturer Bozankaya was received in September 2018. However, work on additional vehicles was suspended because of various problems, and in 2020 the single vehicle delivered in 2018 remained the only trolleybus completed. A revised date for the eventual opening of the first line has yet to be set.

The main highway from Gaziantep to Diyarbakır now bypasses Urfa on the northwest.

Climate
Urfa has a hot-summer Mediterranean climate (Köppen: Csa, Trewartha: Cs). During the summer months, temperatures often exceed  while rainfall is almost non-existent. Winters are cool and relatively wet, frost is common along with very sporadic snowfall. Spring and autumn are warm and moderately dry.

See also

 Cilicia War
 Urfa Resistance
 Chronology of the Turkish War of Independence
 Cities of the ancient Near East
 Haliliye
 Karaköprü
 Göbekli Tepe
 Ur of the Chaldees in southern Iraq, also claimed as the birthplace of Abraham

Notes

References

External links

 Şanlıurfa Governor's Office (English)
 Urfa Haber
 Old and new photos
 Sanliurfa Mayor's Office
 Tourism information is available in English at the Southeastern Anatolian Promotion Project site.
 Photos from Balikli Gol in the old part of Urfa
 Over 1000 pictures of sites in town

Populated places established in the 9th millennium BC
Populated places in Şanlıurfa Province
Şanlıurfa
Districts of Şanlıurfa Province
Southeastern Anatolia Region
World Heritage Tentative List for Turkey
Kurdish settlements in Turkey
Arab settlements in Turkey
Pre-Pottery Neolithic A
City-states
Former kingdoms